Mister and Miss Supranational Thailand is a national pageant to select Thailand's representative to the Mister Supranational and Miss Supranational pageant. This pageant is unrelated to the Miss Universe Thailand, Miss Thailand World or Miss International Thailand national contests.

Miss Supranational Thailand

Winners by province

Gallery of Miss Supranational Thailand

International placements 
Color keys

Miss Supranational

Mister Supranational Thailand

Winners by province

Gallery of Mister Supranational Thailand

International placements 
Color keys

Mister Supranational

See also

References

External links 

  Page

Miss Supranational Thailand
Beauty pageants in Thailand
Thailand
Thailand
Thailand
Thailand